Lieutenant General Hunter Liggett (March 21, 1857 − December 30, 1935) was a senior United States Army officer. His 42 years of military service spanned the period from the Indian campaigns to the trench warfare of World War I. Additionally, he also identified possible invasion sites in Luzon, particularly Lingayen Gulf, which were used during World War II in 1941 by the Japanese and in 1945 by the United States.

Early life 
Liggett was born on March 21, 1857 in Reading, Pennsylvania. He attended, and later graduated, from the United States Military Academy (USMA) at West Point, New York as a second lieutenant in 1879. Among his fellow classmates included several general officers of the future, such as William D. Beach, John S. Mallory, James A. Irons, Lloyd M. Brett, Albert L. Mills, John A. Johnston, Henry A. Greene, Frederick S. Foltz and Samuel W. Miller.

After his graduation, he was assigned to the 5th Infantry, where he served in both the Montana and Dakota territories, as well as Texas and Florida, during which time he reached the rank of captain.

Liggett's field service in the American west, the Spanish–American War, and the Philippine–American War honed his skills as a military leader. In 1907, he assumed command of a battalion of the 13th Infantry Regiment at Fort Leavenworth, Kansas. From 1909 to 1914, he served as student, faculty member, and president at the Army War College, receiving a promotion to brigadier general in February 1913.

Liggett's services in the Philippines included setting up a staff ride in 1914 to study possible invasion sites on Luzon. He was assisted in this by his aide-de-camp, Captain George C. Marshall. The staff ride established that the most likely invasion route would be through Lingayen Gulf and that this would be all but unstoppable unless the US dramatically increased its army and navy forces in the Philippines. In 1941, the Japanese invaded through Lingayen Gulf, as the United States did in turn in 1945.

World War I

Success in brigade commands in Texas and in the Philippines led to his promotion to major general, and selection as commander of the 41st Division in April 1917. The division served in France as part of the American Expeditionary Force. When his division was disestablished, he took command of I Corps.

Under Liggett's leadership, the I Corps participated in the Second Battle of the Marne and in the reduction of the Saint-Mihiel salient. In October 1918, as commander of the First United States Army with the rank of lieutenant general in the national army, he directed the final phases of the Meuse-Argonne offensive and the pursuit of German forces until the armistice.  After commanding the post-war Army of Occupation, Liggett returned to his permanent rank of major general, and retired in 1921.

Throughout most of this period, Liggett's aide-de-camp was James Garesche Ord, a major general in World War II.

Retirement and death
Liggett wrote about his war time experiences in A.E.F.: Ten Years Ago in France (1928). In 1930, Congress passed a law permitting World War I general officers to retire at the highest rank they had held, and Liggett was promoted to lieutenant general on the retired list. He died December 30, 1935 in San Francisco, California and is interred at the San Francisco National Cemetery.

Honors and awards

Military honors

American awards

Foreign awards

Army Distinguished Service medal citation
Citation

Other honors
In his honor, the United States Army named a base on California's central coast, Fort Hunter Liggett.

Liggett Hall is a regimental-sized barracks building constructed at Fort Jay on Governors Island in New York Harbor. Completed in 1930, it was thought to be the largest building constructed by the U.S. Army and was the largest structure built under the supervision of the U.S. Army Quartermaster Corps. It  was superseded by the Pentagon, constructed by the U.S. Army Corps of Engineers in 1943.

The  was a passenger ship that was transferred to the Army and renamed Hunter Liggett in February 1939. The ship transported personnel and supplies until May 27, 1941, when she was turned over to the Navy. Converted to Navy use at Brooklyn Navy Yard, she re-commissioned as AP-27 June 9, 1941,  and then again reclassified APA-14 February 1, 1943 for the United States Coast Guard.

Dates of rank

Source: Army Register, 1931

See also

 List of United States Military Academy alumni
 List of major generals in the United States Regular Army before July 1, 1920
 List of lieutenant generals in the United States Army before 1960

References

Bibliography

External links

|-

|-

|-

|-

1857 births
1935 deaths
United States Army generals of World War I
United States Military Academy alumni
Recipients of the Distinguished Service Medal (US Army)
American military personnel of the Indian Wars
American military personnel of the Spanish–American War
American military personnel of the Philippine–American War
United States Army generals
United States Army War College faculty
People from Reading, Pennsylvania
United States Army War College alumni
Military personnel from Pennsylvania
Recipients of the Legion of Honour
Knights of the Order of Saints Maurice and Lazarus
Recipients of the Croix de Guerre 1914–1918 (France)
Burials at San Francisco National Cemetery